Lucciana is a French commune in the department of Upper Corsica, collectivity and island of Corsica.

Geography

The international airport of Bastia - Poretta is situated in the commune.

History
The Roman town of Mariana had been founded by Gaius Marius in 93 BC.  It was the seat of the Roman Catholic diocese of Mariana, associated with the dioceses of Pisa and Genoa, which lasted until it was transferred, along with all Corsican bishoprics, by the Concordat of 1801 to the Diocese of Ajaccio. The former cathedral, generally known as the church of La Canonica, is a notable Romanesque building of the 12th century.

Economy
 A static inverter plant of HVDC SACOI located in the commune connects the power grids of Corsica and Sardinia with the grid of the Italian mainland.

Population

Sights
The Cathedral of the Canonica.  Romanesque architecture from the 11th century. Renovated and dedicated to the Assumption of Mary. The cathedral features a statue of the Corsican patron saint Devota and a bronze figure of Christ by MC Sei Dominici.
The archeological site of Mariana - excavations open to the public.
It has been used as a special stage in the Tour de Corse.

See also 
 Communes of the Haute-Corse department
 Railway stations in Corsica

References

Communes of Haute-Corse
Haute-Corse communes articles needing translation from French Wikipedia